Dead Guy may refer to:

The Dead Guy, a satirical play by Eric Coble
Deadguy, a metalcore band
Dead Guy Ale, a beer made by Rogue Ales
"Dead Guy" a song from the Bad Boys soundtrack (1995)
"Dead Guy" a song from the Ministry album Filth Pig (1996)
"Dead Guy", an episode from the first season of Malcolm & Eddie

See also
Dead man (disambiguation)
Deadman (disambiguation)